The 1916 Washington football team was an American football team that represented the University of Washington during the 1916 college football season. In its ninth season under coach Gil Dobie, the team compiled a 6–0–1 record, was champion of the new Pacific Coast Conference, and outscored its opponents by a combined total of 189 to 16. Louis Seagraves was the team captain.

Washington played to a scoreless tie with border rival Oregon at Eugene. Both ended the season undefeated, but Oregon was invited to the Rose Bowl on 

For a second consecutive year, Washington did not play in-state rival Washington State.

Schedule

References

Washington
Washington Huskies football seasons
College football undefeated seasons
Pac-12 Conference football champion seasons
Washington football